Spanțov is a commune in Călărași County, Muntenia, Romania. It is composed of three villages: Cetatea Veche, Spanțov, and Stancea.

The commune lies on the left bank of the Danube River, in the southern reaches of the Bărăgan Plain. It is located in the southwestern part of Călărași County, on the border with Bulgaria. It is traversed by national road , which connects it to Oltenița,  to the east, and to the county seat, Călărași,  to the west.

At the 2011 census, Spanțov had a population of 4,605. Of those, 64.04% were ethnic Romanians and 31.25% Roma.

Natives
Aurel Mihale

References

Communes in Călărași County
Localities in Muntenia